These are the results of the Women's 100 metres event at the 2006 European Athletics Championships in Gothenburg, Sweden. There were a total number of 30 participating athletes.

The final was held on Wednesday August 9, 2006. Gevaert lead from the start, and was an obvious winner, with a few other athletes in contention however Grigoryeva and the 40-year-old Khabarova claimed the silver and bronze medals respectively.

Medalists

Schedule

Records

Results

Round 1
Qualification: First 3 in each heat (Q) and the next 4 fastest (q) advance to the semifinals.

Semifinals
First 4 of each Semifinal will be directly qualified (Q) for the Final.

Semifinal 1

Semifinal 2

Final

References
 Official results
 Results
Results

100
100 metres at the European Athletics Championships
2006 in women's athletics